Ongamira is a valley located north of the Valle de Punilla and northwest of the city of Córdoba, Argentina. The name of this valley derives from the word "Unca-mira", where "Unca" refers to the name of a tribal chief, and "mira" refers to a place. Ongamira is known for its caves and grottoes, which are both naturally and archaeologically relevant.

Geography 
Having dense and rough vegetation, the valley of Ongamira is characterized by the existence of small and, often disguised, waterfalls, as well as by the presence of red hills that surround the valley.

History 
Córdoba's founder, Jerónimo Luis de Cabrera, granted the lands of Ongamira to Blas de Rosales, who was the first Spanish conquistador to reach the valley in 1573. After a year of bloody confrontations with the Comechingones, the region's indigenous peoples, the Spanish took control of the valley. As a result, the majority of the indigenous population died, with a great number of them committing suicide.

References 

Valleys of Argentina
Archaeological sites in Argentina